The Wakeby distribution is a five-parameter probability distribution defined by its quantile function,

,

and by its quantile density function,

,

where , ξ is a location parameter, α and γ are scale parameters and 
β and δ are shape parameters.

This distribution was first proposed by Harold A. Thomas Jr., who named it after Wakeby Pond in Cape Cod.

Applications 
The Wakeby distribution has been used for modeling distributions of

 flood flows, 
 citation counts,
 extreme rainfall,
 tidal current speeds,
 and peak flows of rivers.

Parameters and domain 
The following restrictions apply to the parameters of this distribution:

   
   Either  or 
   If , then 
    
   

The domain of the Wakeby distribution is

With two shape parameters, the Wakeby distribution can model a wide variety of shapes.

CDF and PDF 
The cumulative distribution function is computed by numerically inverting the quantile function given above. The probability density function is then found by using the following relation (given on page 46 of Johnson, Kotz, and Balakrishnan):

where F is the cumulative distribution function and

An implementation that computes the probability density function of the Wakeby distribution is included in the Dataplot scientific computation library, as routine WAKPDF.

This can be set up as a probability density function, by solving for the unique  in the equation  and returning .

See also 
 Generalized Pareto distribution

References

External links 
 Discussion of the naming of the distribution on Stack Exchange

Note: this work is based on a NIST document that is in the public domain as a work of the U.S. federal government

Continuous distributions